Otlertuzumab (TRU‐016) is a humanized monoclonal antibody that targets CD37 designed for the treatment of cancer.

This drug was developed by Emergent BioSolutions and has been in clinical trials for lymphoma and Chronic Lymphocytic Leukemia (CLL)

References 

Monoclonal antibodies